The Ace Embilipitiya Power Station (also sometimes referred to as the Embilipitiya Power Station) is a  thermal power station in Embilipitiya, Sri Lanka. The heavy fuel oil-run power station was commissioned in March 2005, and was operated by Aitken Spence (sometimes shortened to Ace). The Ministry of Power and Energy discontinued purchasing power from the private power station after its license expired in 2015, and hence was subsequently decommissioned.

In March 2016 Ceylon Electricity Board decided to recommission the plant due to high electricity demand in the country.  The facility cost approximately Rs. 8 billion to develop, and is built on a  land on a 33-year lease.

See also 
 Heladhanavi Power Station
 List of power stations in Sri Lanka

References

External links 
 
 
 
 
 

Oil-fired power stations in Sri Lanka
Buildings and structures in Ratnapura District